Lelu Island is an island of the Range 5 Coast Land District, of British Columbia, Canada, located in the Skeena Estuary between Smith and Ridley Islands. Historically it has been inhabited by area First Nations. Immediately southwest and associated with the island is the Flora Bank, a unique geomorphic feature supporting a critical fish habitat.

Proposed Pacific NorthWest LNG export facility

Petronas made a proposal for a liquefied natural gas export facility on this island in 2013. In September 2015, members of Lax Kw'alaams Nation began occupation of a camp on the island in opposition to the facility. In April 2016, the Prince Rupert Port Authority ordered a stop to construction of the camp. In September 2016, the Canadian federal government approved the project with 190 conditions, but members of the Lax Kw'alaams nation maintained their camp opposing the project.

The proposal had previously been opposed by unanimous vote but then supported by John Helin the mayor of the Lax Kw'alaams First Nation while still finding opposition among its hereditary chiefs, and is supported by Premier of British Columbia Christy Clark.

On July 25, 2017, Petronas announced they were abandoning the proposed export facility. The reasons for ending the project included market factors as well as political opposition.

References

Islands of British Columbia
Range 5 Coast Land District